Mike Crawley is a Canadian businessman and has been president and CEO of Northland Power since 2018 having joined the company's Executive team in 2015.

He is originally from the Ottawa region. On January 14, 2012, he was elected president of the Liberal Party of Canada for a two-year term, defeating former Member of Parliament Sheila Copps by 26 votes. Crawley was previously president of the federal party's Ontario wing.

From 2002 to 2009, Crawley was CEO of AIM PowerGen Corporation, a wind and solar power developer, owner and operator  until International Power Inc. acquired it in 2009.  Crawley continued as President of International Power Canada and, its successor, GDF Suez Canada until 2014.

Previously he worked in senior roles for Canadian Imperial Bank of Commerce.

References

Living people
Canadian chief executives
Canadian company founders
Canadian political consultants
Businesspeople from Toronto
Presidents of the Liberal Party of Canada
Ontario provincial political party presidents
Year of birth missing (living people)